Playism (stylized as PLAYISM) is an independent video game publisher operated by Active Gaming Media. Playism started as a digital distribution platform for PC games, launched in May 2011.

History
Playism was launched in May 2011 as a digital distribution platform for PC games.

In April 2013, Playism began a project with HAL College of Technology & Design in both Osaka and Nagoya. The project involves students creating games in four-person teams over a period of several months. The games would then be judged by PLAYISM staff, Daisuke "Pixel" Amaya (Cave Story), Smoking Wolf (One Way Heroics), and members of Nigoro (La-Mulana). The highest-rated games were then localized by PLAYISM, and released on the PLAYISM store page for purchase. 

Playism was closely involved in the administration of the indie-based game event  in March 2013, helping both with translation and interpretation as well as with logistics. In September 2013, Playism collaborated with Sony Computer Entertainment Japan Asia on an event called Indie Stream. Originally planned by indie developers Nigoro and Nyamyam, Indie Stream was designed to bring indie developers from both Japan and abroad together to meet and share information. It was announced at Indie Stream that PLAYISM would be assisting indie developers in publishing their games on PlayStation 4 and PlayStation Vita in Japan.

In 2021, the Playism digital distribution platform has closed, Playism focusing now on their publishing activities on PC and consoles.

Notable titles 

 Bright Memory
 Bright Memory: Infinite
 D4: Dark Dreams Don't Die
 Gnosia
 The Good Life
 Ib (remake)
 Idol Manager
 Kero Blaster
 La-Mulana
 La-Mulana 2
 Mighty Goose
 Momodora: Reverie Under the Moonlight
 Night in the Woods
 NightCry
 OMORI
 Pixel Game Maker MV
 Record of Lodoss War: Deedlit in Wonder Labyrinth
 SIGNALIS
 VA-11 Hall-A
 Yume Nikki

References

External links

 

Video game companies of Japan
Companies based in Osaka Prefecture
Translation companies
Online-only retailers of video games
Pay what you want game vendors
E-commerce in Japan
Video game companies established in 2011
Japanese companies established in 2011
Video game publishers